Heteroponera imbellis is a species of ant, in the genus Heteroponera. Endemic to Australia, it was described by Emery in 1895.

References

Heteroponerinae
Hymenoptera of Australia
Insects of Australia
Insects described in 1895